Acompocoris is a genus of minute pirate bugs in the family Anthocoridae. There are at least four described species in Acompocoris.

Species
These four species belong to the genus Acompocoris:
 Acompocoris alpinus (Reuter, 1875)
 Acompocoris lepidus (Van Duzee, 1921)
 Acompocoris montanus Wagner, 1955
 Acompocoris pygmaeus (Fallén, 1807)

References

Further reading

External links

 

Anthocorini
Articles created by Qbugbot